Les Périades is a sharp and heavily-pinnacled mountain ridge, stretching for over  in the Mont Blanc massif in Haute-Savoie, France. It runs in a southerly direction from the Col du Tacul to the Col du Mont Mallet. Its highest point is Pointe Cupelin

Principal points along th crest of Les Périades, from south to north:
 Pointe Auguste Cupelin - 3549 m
 Pointe 3517 m
 Pointe de la Fenêtre - 3507 m
 Pointe de Sisyphe - 3460 m
 Pointe Alfred Simond 3457 m
 Pointe Nini - 3455 m
 Pointe Francois Simond - 3493 m
 Pointe des Périades (or Pointe Paul Perret) - 3503 m

Les Périades are divided into three parts by the Brèche Puiseux (or Brèche Supérieure des Périades) and by the Brèche des Périades.

It eventually became the property of the French Alpine Club, and was renovated in 1996. The site collapsed in 2019 during the summer heatwave which caused previously frozen ground to become unstable. It was replaced in 2020, following a public fund-raising campaign, and can accommodate three or four people.:

References

External links
Les Périades on French IGN Geoportal

Mountains of the Alps
Alpine three-thousanders
Mountains of Haute-Savoie